The 35th Red Banner Orders of Kutuzov and Aleksandr Nevsky Rocket Division is a strategic missile division of the Strategic Rocket Forces of Russia. Part of the  33rd Guards Rocket Army, the division is based in the closed settlement (ZATO) of Sibirsky, near Barnaul, Altai Krai.

History

The unit was created in 1942 as 21st Light Artillery Brigade of the Reserve of the Supreme High Command in the settlement of Rublyovo (a part of Moscow). It was part of the 6th Artillery Division of the 5th Army and included the 200th Red Banner Pomeranian, 1171st and 1314th Artillery Regiments. The brigade took part in World War II. Beginning its combat operations near the town of Zhizdra, the brigade passed through Mozyr, Kalinkovichi, Karachev, Gomel, Minsk, Warsaw, Berlin, and ended the war on the River Elbe. The brigade was awarded the Order of Red Banner, the Order of Alexander Nevsky, and the Order of Kutuzov, 2nd class.

After the end of World War II, the brigade was based in the city of Rathenow in East Germany. In July 1945, it received new weaponry and was renamed the 65th Heavy Mortar Brigade.

At the end of June 1960, the brigade was relocated to Prokhladny in the North Caucasus Military District, where it was used to form the 46th Missile Brigade. The brigade included the 178th Missile Regiment (formed in August 1959), the 479th Pomeranian Missile Regiment from late 1960, and the 480th Dresden Missile Regiment. 

The brigade was redesignated as the 35th Missile Division in April 1961, inheriting the awards of the brigade, and became part of the 43rd Rocket Army. The first battalion of the 178th Missile Regiment with four R-12 ground launchers became the first unit of the division to go on alert duty on 18 April 1961. During the same year, division headquarters was relocated to Ordzhonikidze. During the Groza strategic exercises on 22 December 1963, under the supervision of the Soviet Minister of Defense, the division conducted its first missile launch from a launch site. The division headquarters was relocated to the village of Oktyabrskoye, North Ossetia in 1967. Between 3 and 8 June 1968, during the Vesenny Grom (Spring Thunder) strategic exercise, the division fired a salvo of missiles for the first time. On 18 July 1974, a training launch of all three missiles of the 3rd battalion of the 480th Missile Regiment was made during an experimental exercise.  

In 1982, the division was relocated to Borovikha in Altai Krai, where it became part of the 33rd Guards Rocket Army. From 1984 to 1989, the division was commanded by Colonel-General Nikolay Solovtsov, who from 2001 to 2009 was the Commander-in-Chief of the Strategic Rocket Forces. In November 1991, the division was re-equipped with RS-12M Topol intercontinental ballistic missiles, for a total of 36.  The rearmament was completed in December 1994.

As of 2013, the division commander was Colonel Sergey Andreyevich Talatynnik.

The division was scheduled to be entirely rearmed with RS-24 Yars intercontinental ballistic missiles during 2022. The regimental command post and first battalion of the 867th Missile Regiment went on alert duty with the new missiles in December 2021 and were scheduled to be followed by the rest of the regiment in April 2022.

Commanders

Equipment
Artillery
Mortar
Missiles:
R-12 Dvina medium-range ballistic missile (1961–1981)
R-14 Chusovaya medium-range ballistic missile (1963–1982)
RSD-10 Pioneer mobile ground medium-range ballistic missile system (retired)
RT-2PM Topol intercontinental ballistic missile (1991–2022), rearmament completed December 1994, 36 launchers
RS-24 Yars (scheduled by April 2022)

Notes

Rocket divisions of the Soviet Union
Rocket divisions of Russia
Military units and formations established in 1961